= DNA disruptor =

A DNA disruptor may refer to:

- A mutagen, an agent that causes genetic mutations
- Any agent that causes DNA damage
